The legislative districts of Davao Occidental are the representations of the province of Davao Occidental in the Congress of the Philippines. The province is currently represented in the lower house of the Congress through its lone congressional district.

History 

Prior to gaining separate representation, areas now under the jurisdiction of Davao Occidental were represented under the Department of Mindanao and Sulu (1917–1935), Davao Province (1935–1967), Region XI (1978–1984) and Davao del Sur (1967–1972; 1984–2016).

The passage of Republic Act No. 10360 and its subsequent ratification by plebiscite in 2013 separated from Davao del Sur's second district five municipalities to create the province of Davao Occidental. Per Section 7 of R.A. 10360, the new province was to comprise a single congressional district; voters began to elect the new province's separate representative beginning in 2016.

Lone District 
Population (2015): 316,342

See also 
Legislative district of Mindanao and Sulu
Legislative district of Davao
Legislative district of Davao del Sur

References 

Davao Occidental
Davao Occidental